Zona pellucida sperm-binding protein 2 is a protein that in humans is encoded by the ZP2 gene.

Function 

The zona pellucida is an extracellular matrix that surrounds the oocyte and early embryo. It is composed primarily of three (mouse) or four (human) glycoproteins (ZP1-4) with various functions during fertilization and preimplantation development. The protein encoded by this gene is a structural component of the zona pellucida and functions in secondary binding and penetration of acrosome-reacted spermatozoa. The nascent protein contains a N-terminal signal peptide sequence, a conserved ZP domain, a consensus furin cleavage site, and a C-terminal transmembrane domain. It is hypothesized that furin cleavage results in release of the mature protein from the plasma membrane for subsequent incorporation into the zona pellucida matrix. However, the requirement for furin cleavage in this process remains controversial based on mouse studies.

The sperm-binding domain on the ZP2 protein is necessary in both humans and mice for oocyte-sperm recognition and penetration of the zona pellucida. It is also responsible for the primary block to polyspermy in mammals.  The oocyte has cortical granules peripherally located under the cortex that contain a proteolytic protein called ovastacin. After the sperm binds to ZP2, the cortical granules are exocytosed releasing ovastacin into the perivitelline space.  Ovastacin cleaves ZP2 at the N terminus, preventing more sperm from binding and penetrating the oocyte, thus hardening the zona pellucida. Ovastacin is only found in oocytes, and is part of the astacin family of metalloendoproteases. Female mice engineered without ovastacin showed that ZP2 was not cleaved after fertilization.

3D structure 

The crystal structure of the sperm-binding domain of ZP2 at 0.95 Å resolution showed that is shares the same ZP-N fold first identified in structures of ZP3. This provided experimental evidence for the suggestion that the N-terminal region of ZP2 consists of three ZP-N repeats  and revealed that - despite insignificant sequence identity - ZP2 is structurally similar to VERL, the vitelline envelope receptor for egg lysin of the mollusk abalone. This established a link between invertebrate and vertebrate fertilization by suggesting that, despite being separated by 600 million years of evolution, mollusk and human use a common protein fold to interact with sperm.

References

Further reading